Gunnar Böös (30 May 1894 – 4 February 1987) was a Swedish fencer. He competed in the individual foil event at the 1912 Summer Olympics.

References

External links
 

1894 births
1987 deaths
Swedish male foil fencers
Olympic fencers of Sweden
Fencers at the 1912 Summer Olympics
Sportspeople from Lund
20th-century Swedish people